The Glasgow Film Festival is an annual film festival based in Glasgow, Scotland. The festival began in 2005. By 2015, the festival had seen audience figures top 40,000 for two consecutive years. It is now considered one of the top three film festivals in the UK.

2008
2008's festival took place between 14–24 February and the programme included exclusive premieres as well as a Bette Davis retrospective.

2009
The 2009 event featured an Audrey Hepburn retrospective and a birthday tribute to Errol Flynn.

2010
2010's festival took place between 18–28 February. The opening gala featured Jean-Pierre Jeunet's latest film, Micmacs with the director there to present the film. Other guests included Peter Mullan, James Earl Jones and the cast of Scottish classic, Gregory's Girl. Oscar nominated Crazy Heart was also shown, prior to the general release date. Also included a Cary Grant retrospective, as well as strands focusing on Japanese Cinema, Fashion and Music and film.

2013
The 2013 festival was scheduled to feature 57 UK film premieres.

2014
With the festival lasting 11 days from February 18 to March 1, admission figures topped 40,000.

2015
2015's festival featured 174 events, including 11 world premieres, 33 UK premieres and 65 Scottish premieres. The festival introduced its first award - The Audience Award, won by Tom Browne's Radiator.

2016
2016's festival featured 174 feature films including 60 UK premieres. Admissions reached 42,000. The Audience Award was won by Deniz Gamze Ergüven's Mustang.

2017
2017 saw the festival attain over 40,000 admissions for the fourth consecutive year. Featuring 65 UK premieres, programme highlights included Elle, I Am Not Your Negro, Free Fire and a screening of John Carpenter's The Thing on an indoor ski slope. Empire Magazine presented a special screening of The Lost Boys as a secret location. The Audience Award was won by Alankrita Shrivastava's Lipstick Under My Burkha.

2020
The 2020 programme includes nine world premieres and 102 UK premieres. Adura Onashile's Expensive Shit won the audience and the critics award.

2023
The 2023 edition will be held from March 1 to 12. The 19th edition of the festival will screen 123 features, including six world premieres, 16 European and international premieres and 70 UK premieres. The festival will open with Adura Onashile’s Glasgow-shot feature debut Girl, and close with Nida Manzoor’s Polite Society.

Audience Award
In 2015 GFF introduced its only award, the Audience Award. Films eligible for the award are usually from first or second time directors and can be either fiction or documentary. The award is voted for by attendees with the winner announced at the Closing Gala of the Festival.

See also
Culture in Glasgow

References

External links
 

Film festivals in Glasgow
Tourist attractions in Glasgow
Annual events in Glasgow
2005 establishments in Scotland
Film festivals established in 2005